Chaudhary Brahm Prakash Yadav (1918–1993) was an Indian politician, the first Chief Minister of Delhi, also Called as sher-e-delhi, and a freedom fighter who played an important role in the individual Satyagraha Movement launched by Mahatma Gandhi in 1940.  He hailed from Rewari, Haryana.

Career

Indian Independence movement 
He was amongst the leaders of the underground activities in Delhi during the Quit India movement. He was imprisoned many times during the freedom struggle.

Post independence 
Post-independence, Prakash served as Minister in charge of Planning and Development as well as the first Chief Minister of Delhi at the age of 34 years, the second-youngest Chief Minister in India in 1952–55. His stints in the Parliament twice won him accolades as an able parliamentarian. While he was with Congress Party, he was elected to Lok Sabha from Delhi Sadar constituency in 1957, and from Outer Delhi in 1962 and 1967. He joined Janata Party later, and was elected to Lok Sabha again in 1977 from Outer Delhi. When the party split in 1979, he joined the Charan Singh faction, and became a minister for a few months. He made noteworthy contributions as the Union Cabinet Minister for Food, Agriculture, Irrigation and Cooperatives.

The cause of depressed sections of the society, rural development and empowerment of the weaker sections were issues, which were very close to the heart of Prakash. He was quick to realise the potential of cooperative societies in mitigating the hardships of the village folks. As early as in 1945, he started organising village and agriculture cooperatives. He was also a proponent of the Panchayati Raj institutions. He organised the National Union of Backward Classes, Scheduled Castes, Scheduled Tribes and Minorities in 1977 to work for the welfare of these weaker sections.

Prakash and Dr. Kurien of NDDB promoted the idea of Cooperative Companies to help free the cooperatives from the shackles of Government control through the Registrar of Cooperative Societies. It was a precursor to the present Producer Company model.

References

External links
 Commemorative Postage Stamp on the First Chief Minister of Delhi Chaudhary Brahm Prakash
 Commemorative Postage Stamp on Chaudhary Brahm Prakash Released
 Chaudhary Brahm Prakash Delhi Rajkiya Charak Ayurvedic Sansthan
 Outer Delhi
 Delhi Sadar
 List of chief ministers of Delhi

1918 births
1993 deaths
Chief Ministers of Delhi
People from West Delhi district
India MPs 1962–1967
India MPs 1967–1970
India MPs 1977–1979
India MPs 1957–1962
Lok Sabha members from Delhi
Indian independence activists from Delhi
Prisoners and detainees of British India
Indian National Congress politicians from Delhi
Gandhians
Chief ministers from Indian National Congress
Agriculture Ministers of India
Members of the Cabinet of India
Janata Party politicians
Janata Party (Secular)